Ondigui Adams, usually known as Adams (born December 28, 1987 in Yaoundé), is a Cameroonian football defensive midfielder.

Before moving to Portuguesa Santista, in 2006, he played for Nassara, which is a Cameroonian team. In 2006, he also played for Santos. In 2007, he joined Sport Recife, and then moved on loan to Grêmio, returning to Portuguesa Santista in 2008.

References

1987 births
Living people
Footballers from Yaoundé
Cameroonian footballers
Cameroonian expatriate footballers
Grêmio Foot-Ball Porto Alegrense players
Associação Atlética Portuguesa (Santos) players
Santos FC players
Sport Club do Recife players
Expatriate footballers in Brazil
Cameroonian expatriate sportspeople in Brazil
Association football midfielders